Anumula is a village in Nalgonda district, Telangana, India. It is the headquarters of Anumula mandal in Miryalaguda division.

Between Anumula and nearby Haliya lies the Nagarjuna Sagar left canal (a.k.a. Lalbahadur Shastri canal), which is 295 km long and irrigates 0.32 million acres (800 km²) of land in Nalgonda and Khammam districts of Telangana region.

References

Mandal headquarters in Nalgonda district
Nalgonda district